The 1998–99 NCAA Division I men's basketball season concluded in the 64-team 1999 NCAA Division I men's basketball tournament whose finals were held at Tropicana Field in St. Petersburg, Florida. The Connecticut Huskies earned their first national championship by defeating the Duke Blue Devils 77–74 on March 29, 1999. They were coached by Jim Calhoun and the NCAA basketball tournament Most Outstanding Player was Richard Hamilton.

In the 32-team 1999 National Invitation Tournament, the  defeated the Clemson Tigers at the Madison Square Garden in New York City.

Following the season, the 1999 NCAA Men's Basketball All-American Consensus First team included Elton Brand, Mateen Cleaves, Richard Hamilton, Andre Miller and Jason Terry. The consensus second team was composed of Evan Eschmeyer, Steve Francis, Trajan Langdon, Chris Porter and Wally Szczerbiak.

Season headlines 
 The preseason AP All-American team was named on November 10. Richard Hamilton of Connecticut was the leading vote-getter (66 of 72 votes). The rest of the team included Mateen Cleaves of Michigan State (58 votes), Elton Brand of Duke (55), Lee Nailon of TCU (50) and Andre Miller of Utah (44).

Conference membership changes 

These schools joined new conferences for the 1998–99 season.

Season outlook

Pre-season polls 
The top 25 from the AP Poll November 6, 1998 and the ESPN/USA Today Poll November 5, 1998.

Regular season

Conference winners and tournaments 
28 conference seasons concluded with a single-elimination tournament, with only the Ivy League and the Pac-10 choosing not to conduct conference tournaments. Conference tournament winners generally received an automatic bid to the NCAA tournament.

Statistical leaders

Award winners

Consensus All-American teams

Major player of the year awards 
 Wooden Award: Elton Brand, Duke
 Naismith Award: Elton Brand, Duke
 Associated Press Player of the Year: Elton Brand, Duke
 NABC Player of the Year: Elton Brand, Duke
 Oscar Robertson Trophy (USBWA): Elton Brand, Duke
 Adolph Rupp Trophy: Elton Brand, Duke
 Sporting News Player of the Year: Elton Brand, Duke

Major freshman of the year awards 
 USBWA Freshman of the Year: Quentin Richardson, DePaul
 Sporting News Freshman of the Year: Quentin Richardson, DePaul

Major coach of the year awards 
 Associated Press Coach of the Year: Cliff Ellis, Auburn
 Henry Iba Award (USBWA): Cliff Ellis, Auburn
 NABC Coach of the Year: Mike Krzyzewski, Duke & Jim O'Brien, Ohio State
 Naismith College Coach of the Year: Mike Krzyzewski, Duke
 CBS/Chevrolet Coach of the Year: Cliff Ellis, Auburn
 Sporting News Coach of the Year: Cliff Ellis, Auburn

Other major awards 
 NABC Defensive Player of the Year: Shane Battier, Duke
 Frances Pomeroy Naismith Award (Best player under 6'0): Shawnta Rogers, George Washington
 Robert V. Geasey Trophy (Top player in Philadelphia Big 5): Pepe Sánchez, Temple
 NIT/Haggerty Award (Top player in New York City metro area): Ron Artest, St. John's
 Chip Hilton Player of the Year Award (Strong personal character): Tim Hill, Harvard

Coaching changes 

A number of teams changed coaches during the season and after it ended.

References